The 2022 Dead On Tools 250 was the 32nd stock car race of the 2022 NASCAR Xfinity Series, the final race of the Round of 8, and the 16th iteration of the event. The race was held on Saturday, October 29, 2022, in Ridgeway, Virginia at Martinsville Speedway, a  permanent paperclip-shaped short track. The race was increased from 250 laps to 269 laps, due to numerous NASCAR overtime finishes. In a chaotic race that brought several cautions, Ty Gibbs, driving for Joe Gibbs Racing, would win the race in controversy, after he would bump into his teammate, Brandon Jones, on the final lap, causing him to spin in turn two. Gibbs would dominate for parts of the race as well, leading 102 laps. This was Gibbs' 10th career NASCAR Xfinity Series win, and his sixth of the season. Gibbs would also earn a spot in the championship four, despite already advancing on points. To fill out the podium, Sheldon Creed, driving for Richard Childress Racing, and Riley Herbst, driving for Stewart-Haas Racing, would finish 2nd and 3rd respectively.

Meanwhile, the drivers that will advance into championship four are Justin Allgaier, Josh Berry, Noah Gragson, and Ty Gibbs. A. J. Allmendinger, Austin Hill, Sam Mayer, and Brandon Jones would be eliminated from the playoffs.

Background 
Martinsville Speedway is a NASCAR-owned stock car racing short track in Ridgeway, Virginia, just south of Martinsville. At  in length, it is the shortest track in the NASCAR Cup Series. The track was also one of the first paved oval tracks in stock car racing, being built in 1947 by partners H. Clay Earles, Henry Lawrence, and Sam Rice, nearly a year before NASCAR was officially formed. It is also the only race track that has been on the NASCAR circuit from its beginning in 1948. Along with this, Martinsville is the only oval track on the NASCAR circuit to have asphalt surfaces on the straightaways and concrete to cover the turns.

Entry list 

 (R) denotes rookie driver.
 (i) denotes driver who are ineligible for series driver points.

Practice 
For practice, drivers will be separated into two groups, Group A and B. Both sessions will be 15 minutes long, and was held on Friday, October 28, at 4:00 PM EST.

Qualifying 
Qualifying was held on Friday, October 28, at 4:35 PM EST. Since Martinsville Speedway is a short track, the qualifying system used is a single-car, two-lap system with only one round. Whoever sets the fastest time in the round wins the pole.

Race results 
Stage 1 Laps: 60

Stage 2 Laps: 60

Stage 3 Laps: 149*

Standings after the race 

Drivers' Championship standings

Note: Only the first 12 positions are included for the driver standings.

References 

2022 NASCAR Xfinity Series
NASCAR races at Martinsville Speedway
Dead On Tools 250
Dead On Tools 250